Disco Destroyer is the eighth studio album by German thrash metal band Tankard. This is their first album released by Century Media.

Track listing

Personnel
 Andreas "Gerre" Geremia - vocals
 Frank Thorwarth - bass
 Andy Bulgaropulos - guitars
 Olaf Zissel - drums

References

1998 albums
Tankard (band) albums
Century Media Records albums
Albums produced by Harris Johns